Enclosure Historic District is a historic district located in Nutley, Essex County, New Jersey, United States. The buildings in the district were built in 1812 and were added to the National Register of Historic Places on December 31, 1974.

See also
National Register of Historic Places listings in Essex County, New Jersey

References

Houses on the National Register of Historic Places in New Jersey
Queen Anne architecture in New Jersey
Italianate architecture in New Jersey
Houses completed in 1812
Geography of Essex County, New Jersey
Nutley, New Jersey
National Register of Historic Places in Essex County, New Jersey
Historic districts in Essex County, New Jersey
Houses in Essex County, New Jersey
Historic districts on the National Register of Historic Places in New Jersey
New Jersey Register of Historic Places
Stone houses in New Jersey